The River Canari is a river on the Caribbean island of Dominica. The adjacent rock formation, which is a persistent 80 degrees Celsius much of the year, has been discussed as a potential site for an enhanced geothermal system for electricity generation.

See also
List of rivers of Dominica

References
 Map of Dominica
  GEOnet Names Server
 Water Resources Assessment of Dominica, Antigua and Barbuda, and St. Kitts and Nevis

Rivers of Dominica